Vincent S. Deeds is a Republican member of the West Virginia Senate, representing the 10th district, and a retired West Virginia state trooper and pastor.

Early life 
Deeds grew up on a dairy farm in Jumping Branch, West Virginia, and attended Summers County High School. After graduating high school, Deeds attended Virginia Polytechnic Institute and State University (Virginia Tech).

Career

West Virginia State Police 
Vince Deeds started his career with the West Virginia State Police (WVSP) in 1994 and retired in 2019 after twenty-five years of service. He retired as a lieutenant colonel. During his career, he served as detachment commander, inspector, sniper team commander, troop commander, and chief of staff services. Deeds was also a member of the WVSP Special Operations unit and a graduate of the FBI National Academy.

Retirement 
After Deeds retired from the West Virginia State Police in 2019, he began working for the Greenbrier County Board of Education as director of safety and security and the Greenbrier County Prosecutor's Office as chief investigator. In 2021, he announced his candidacy for the West Virginia State Senate. Deeds is also the pastor of Sinks Grove Baptist Church in Sinks Grove, West Virginia.

Elections

West Virginia Senate

2022 
In July 2021, Deeds announced his candidacy for West Virginia's 10th Senatorial District and was elected on November 8, 2022. After winning the Republican nomination, Deeds challenged State Senate Minority Leader Stephen Baldwin, and won 58.7-37.9%.

Personal life 
Vince Deeds is married to his wife, Michelle, who is the director of nursing at Pocahontas Memorial Hospital, and has two sons, Justin, a Lewisburg PD officer, and Tristan, a West Point cadet. They reside in Renick, West Virginia.

References 

1970 births
Republican Party West Virginia state senators
Virginia Tech alumni
Baptist ministers from the United States
Politicians from Beckley, West Virginia
Living people
American law enforcement officials
FBI National Academy graduates